Symvoli (before 1927: Μπάνιτσα - Banitsa, Bulgarian/Macedonian: Баница - Banitsa, Banica) is a village in the eastern part of the municipal unit of Kormista in the Serres regional unit, Macedonia, Greece.  It is located on the left bank of the river Angitis, in the easternmost part of the regional unit, near the regional unit of Drama. The community includes the settlement Ano Symvoli.

Historical population

See also
List of settlements in the Serres regional unit

References

Populated places in Serres (regional unit)